Brunfelsia jamaicensis is a species of flowering plant in the family Solanaceae, the nightshades. It is endemic to Jamaica, where it grows in mountain forests above 1400 meters in elevation.

References

jamaicensis
Endemic flora of Jamaica
Vulnerable plants
Taxonomy articles created by Polbot